Piotr Chmielewski (born 18 September 1970) is a Polish former racing cyclist.

Palmarès

References

External links 

1970 births
Living people
Polish male cyclists
Sportspeople from Lublin
Cyclists at the 2000 Summer Olympics
Olympic cyclists of Poland